Willie Faloon (born 30 September 1986) is a rugby union coach and former player from Northern Ireland. His main position was at flanker and he primarily played at openside. Since 2021, he has been an Elite Performance Development Officer with the Ulster Rugby academy.

Career

Ulster
Faloon's professional team was his native province of Ulster, signing a contract with the side in December 2008. He had previously played for amateur side Ballynahinch in the All-Ireland League and was part of the province's academy system. Faloon played his first game for Ulster on 24 January 2009, in a 2008–09 Heineken Cup game with Stade Francais. He made his league debut for the team in the final game of the 2008–09 Celtic League, against Scarlets.

In his second season with the side, Faloon appeared more often. He played in 13 games in the 2009–10 Celtic League, starting 12 of them, and scored his first try for the team against Scarlets on 2 October 2009. In European competition Faloon played in 4 games, starting 3 of them and scoring a try against Bath.

In the 2010–11 Celtic League, Faloon played in 17 games for Ulster as they climbed from their 8th-place finish the previous season to finish sixth and qualify for the play-offs. In that season's Heineken Cup Faloon played in six of the team's seven games, including coming on as a replacement in Ulster's quarter-final against Northampton Saints in Stadium mk.

In his final season with Ulster, Faloon played in 16 of their games in the league, which had been renamed as the Pro 12, as Ulster finished sixth. In the 2011–12 Heineken Cup, Faloon played five, with four of these appearances coming as a replacement. He came on from the bench against Leinster in the final.

In the summer of 2012, Faloon joined rival Irish province and Pro 12 team Connacht on a 2-year deal. It had been announced in March that year that Faloon would be leaving Ulster.

Connacht
Faloon joined Connacht ahead of the 2012–13 season. He played  in 14 games for Connacht in the 2012–13 Pro 12 and scored three tries. Faloon made his European debut for Connacht against Zebre in the 2012–13 Heineken Cup, and played 3 times for the team in the competition, starting in each game. In his first season with his new side, Faloon made an outstanding impression and was awarded Connacht Rugby Player of the Month for February 2013. At the end of his first year with the side, the Connacht Clan, the team's supporters club, voted him as their player of the season.

Ulster
On 10 February 2015 it was announced that Faloon would be returning to Ulster on a one-year deal.

Coaching
Faloon became head coach of City of Armagh RFC in 2017, leading them to three Ulster Senior Cup titles. He also joined the coaching team of the Royal School, Armagh, leading them to the Ulster Schools' Cup final in 2020. In 2021 he joined the staff of the Ulster academy as Elite Performance Development Officer with responsibility for coaching forwards. He was named defence coach of the Ireland under-20 team for the 2022 under-20 Six Nations.

References

Ballynahinch RFC players
Connacht Rugby players
Living people
1986 births
Ulster Rugby non-playing staff
Ulster Rugby players